Ok Duck-pil (born 10 September 1974) is a South Korean former windsurfer. He competed at the 1996 Summer Olympics, 2000 Summer Olympics and the 2004 Summer Olympics.

References

External links
 
 

1974 births
Living people
South Korean windsurfers
Olympic sailors of South Korea
Sailors at the 1996 Summer Olympics – Mistral One Design
Sailors at the 2000 Summer Olympics – Mistral One Design
Sailors at the 2004 Summer Olympics – Mistral One Design
Sailors at the 1998 Asian Games
Sailors at the 2002 Asian Games
Medalists at the 1998 Asian Games
Medalists at the 2002 Asian Games
Asian Games gold medalists for South Korea
Asian Games bronze medalists for South Korea
Asian Games medalists in sailing